"Achilles Last Stand" is a song by the English rock group Led Zeppelin released as the opening track on their seventh studio album, Presence (1976). Guitarist Jimmy Page and singer Robert Plant began writing the song during the summer of 1975 and were influenced by Eastern music, mythology, and exposure to diverse cultures during their travels. At roughly ten-and-a-half minutes, it is one of the group's longest studio recordings and one of their most complex, with interwoven sections and multiple, overdubbed guitar parts.

The song received mainly positive reviews from music critics, with some comparing "Achilles Last Stand" to other Zeppelin songs such as "Kashmir". The band featured it during concerts from 1977 to 1980, and a 1979 live performance is included on the Led Zeppelin DVD (2003). Page called it his favourite Led Zeppelin song in several interviews, and considers its guitar solo on a par with his "Stairway to Heaven" solo.

Background and lyrics

After their 1975 US tour and London concerts, Led Zeppelin took a break from performing. In order to remain tax exiles, the group members needed to limit their time in the UK. This is alluded to in the song's opening lines: "It was an April morning when they told us we should go, and as I turned to you, you smiled at me, how could we say no". Jimmy Page and Robert Plant went to Morocco in June 1975, where they developed material for their next album. Page heard local music, which influenced his guitar parts on "Achilles Last Stand". North African and Middle Eastern music had inspired earlier Led Zeppelin songs, such as "Friends", "Four Sticks", "No Quarter", and "Kashmir".

Although "Achilles Last Stand" uses mythological imagery drawn from William Blake's Albion, the Atlas myth and the Greek hero Achilles, its lyrics centre around the group's travels during their exile. The title is an ironic reference to Plant's August 1975 automobile accident, in which he severely injured his ankle, as Achilles was brought down by an arrow to his calcaneal tendon. Plant was unable to walk for a year, and recorded much of Presence in a wheelchair; the working title of "Achilles Last Stand" was "The Wheelchair Song". Group biographer Martin Popoff described Plant's lyrics:

Composition and recording

"Achilles Last Stand" opens with Page's Moroccan-influenced solo guitar arpeggios, which Led Zeppelin biographers have described as haunting and mysterious. Drummer John Bonham and bassist John Paul Jones then establish a driving hard rock rhythm that persists throughout the song.  After the long introductory riff is played four times, Plant begins singing. His vocal sections are broken up by brief instrumental passages, and Page adds the first of several overdubbed guitar parts.

At 3:42, the song shifts, and Page plays his first solo. In addition to a change in tempo, the section includes breaks and a switch to 5/4 time, with the rest notated in 4/4 time in the key of E minor with a moderately-fast tempo of 146 beats per minute.  When the vocals return, Page adds more guitars. After a brief slide-guitar part, Plant begins an Eastern-influenced scat-style vocal. At 8:25, Page plays a second solo with more overdubbed parts; a minute and a half later, the song winds down with chords echoing the opening.

After extensive rehearsals in Los Angeles, Led Zeppelin went to Munich to record Presence at Musicland Studios. They recorded the basic tracks for "Achilles Last Stand" during early sessions on 12 November 1975. For the first time during a recording, Jones plays an eight-string bass guitar with a pick. He said that it added more mid-range presence during Page's high-register guitar solos; although Page objected at first, he soon recognized the effectiveness of Jones' innovation. Jones also uses a heavy metal gallop, a rhythmic figure in which an eighth note is followed by two sixteenth notes. To balance the sound, a second bass line was recorded; Popoff describes it as "a more traditional bass track, more elliptical and rife with pregnant pauses, simultaneously lying across the gallop and wholly independent of it."

Without the rest of the group, Page recorded all the guitar overdubs in one evening: "There must be half a dozen going at once. I knew that every guitar overdub had to be very important, very strong within itself to identify each section." The recording for Presence was completed on 27 November 1975, 15 days after the group laid down the basic tracks for "Achilles Last Stand". Page produced the album, with Keith Harwood providing the audio engineering.

Release and performance
Swan Song Records released Led Zeppelin's seventh studio album Presence on 31 March 1976, with "Achilles Last Stand" its opening track. Although the album initially sold well, it was ultimately not a great success for the group. There was no tour to support the album, but in November, after Plant had sufficiently recovered, Led Zeppelin began rehearsing for an American tour. "Achilles Last Stand" was one of the first songs they attempted. Since their studio recording relied heavily on overdubs, they needed an arrangement which would work for a three-piece-plus vocal ensemble. Page recalled:

The song and "Nobody's Fault but Mine" were the only tracks from Presence that the group added to their repertoire. Led Zeppelin performed it at most of their concertsoften late in the set, before "Stairway to Heaven". A live performance of the song at the Knebworth Festival 1979 was filmed, and was later released on the Led Zeppelin DVD in 2003. When Presence was remastered for the 2015 deluxe-album editions, a reference mix of "Achilles Last Stand" entitled "Two Ones Are Won" was included.

Reception
The song received mostly positive reviews from music critics. In a 1976 review of Presence, Rolling Stone journalist Stephen Davis wrote: Achilles Last Stand' could be the Yardbirds, 12 years down the road. The format is familiar: John Bonham's furiously attacking drum is really the lead instrument, until Jimmy Page tires of chording under Plant and takes over." In a more negative view, Jon Young of Spin lambasted the song in his 1991 Led Zeppelin Boxed Set review: "Nothing could be less satisfying than ten minutes of 'Achilles Last Stand,' a simultaneously abrasive and boring ordeal." Music journalist Andrew Earles described it in a retrospective review of Presence as "a galloping, dour yet exhilarating onslaught of genuine heavy metal... 'Achilles Last Stand' can be seen as a precursor to the new wave of British heavy metal that would soon explode all over Europe".

In a 2011 review of Presence published by Classic Rock Review, "Achilles Last Stand" was called the album's "tour de force" and "a true journey", though the reviewer felt that the song was somewhat long and repetitive. In a retrospective review of Presence (Deluxe Edition), Andrew Doscas of PopMatters described "Achilles Last Stand" as the band's "last true epic". AllMusic's Brian Downing called it the album's "most ambitious song... the only one that resembles the layered masterpieces from Physical Graffiti."

See also
List of cover versions of Led Zeppelin songs – "Achilles Last Stand" entries

Notes
Footnotes

Citations

References

External links
"Achilles Last Stand" (Live 1977) video at ledzeppelin.com (official website)

1976 songs
Led Zeppelin songs
Songs written by Robert Plant
Songs written by Jimmy Page